Papaloapan Region is one of the regions of Veracruz, Mexico.

Geography
Papaloapan Region occupies a portion of the southern Gulf Coastal Plain, in the lower basins of the Papaloapan and Blanco rivers. 

It is bounded on the north by the Gulf of Mexico, on the northwest by Sotavento Region, on the west by Mountains Region, on the south by the state of Oaxaca, on the east by Olmeca and Los Tuxtlas regions.

Municipalities 
The Papaloapan region is conformed by the following 22 municipalities.

Notes

References 

Regions of Veracruz